Tibberton and Cherrington is a civil parish in the district of Telford and Wrekin, Shropshire, England.  It contains 16 listed buildings that are recorded in the National Heritage List for England.  Of these, one is at Grade II*, the middle of the three grades, and the others are at Grade II, the lowest grade.  The parish contains the villages of Tibberton and Cherrington, and is otherwise rural.  Almost all the listed buildings are timber framed houses and cottages, the earlier ones with cruck construction.  The other listed buildings consist of red brick houses and a church.


Key

Buildings

References

Citations

Sources

Lists of buildings and structures in Shropshire